Idrissa Seck (born August 9, 1959) is a Senegalese politician who was Prime Minister of Senegal from November 2002 to July 2004. He was a leading member of the Senegalese Democratic Party (PDS) and was considered a protégé of President Abdoulaye Wade, but he subsequently went into opposition and was a candidate in the February 2007 presidential election, taking second place with about 15% of the vote.

Biography

He was born in Thiès and studied in Paris as well as at Princeton University. He joined the PDS when he was 15 years old and was Wade's campaign director in the February 1988 presidential election.

Seck served as Minister of Trade, Crafts, and Industrialization as an opposition member of Abdou Diouf's government. He became deputy leader of the PDS in 1998, replacing Ousmane Ngom. After Wade took office in April 2000, he appointed Seck as Minister of State and Director of the Cabinet. The PDS was restructured after this election; Seck's position of Executive Secretary was eliminated and he instead became Deputy National Secretary. He also became Mayor of Thiès.

Seck was appointed as prime minister by Wade on November 4, 2002, replacing Mame Madior Boye; this was the first time that Wade had appointed a prime minister from the PDS since he took office as president. Seck served as Prime Minister until July 21, 2004, when he was dismissed by Wade.

Seck was detained in July 2005 for alleged corruption in connection with a road project in Thiès, and he was additionally charged with threatening state security. In a decision made on August 4 and announced on August 6, he was expelled from the PDS by its steering committee, along with three of his supporters: Papa Diouf, Awa Gueye Kebe, and Oumar Sarr. He never faced trial; on January 27, 2006, the charge of threatening state security was dismissed, and in early February the corruption charges were also partially dismissed and he was released from prison. On April 4, 2006, he announced his intention to run for president in 2007.

On September 24, 2006, Seck announced the formation of a new party, Rewmi (Wolof for "the country"). On January 22, 2007, Wade said that Seck had agreed to return to the PDS. Seck confirmed this on February 1, but said that he would still run for president.

According to final results released after the presidential election, which was held on February 25, 2007, Seck took second place with 14.92% of the vote, falling far behind Wade, who won a majority in the first round. He won one of the country's 34 departments, that of Thiès. Following the election, Wade announced that several opposition leaders would face prosecution for corruption, including Seck. Wade said that Seck had stolen 40 billion CFA francs and deposited the money abroad; he also said that Seck would not be his successor. Subsequently, after the final results were released on March 11, Seck congratulated Wade on his victory; he was the only major opposition leader to do so.

Seck's Rewmi party participated in a boycott of the June 2007 parliamentary election, announced in early April. Seck said that Wade had broken off dialogue with the opposition and that it would reconsider the boycott if he engaged in dialogue.

After the election, a rapprochement between Wade and Seck and their respective parties began, and Seck sought to return to the PDS. On August 13, 2007, Wade said that the PDS steering committee would have to decide whether or not to readmit Seck and his supporters into the party. Seck and Wade met for several hours on January 12, 2009, and afterwards Seck announced that the two had resolved their "misunderstandings" and had reconciled.

Following the March 2009 local election in Thiès, Seck was again elected as Mayor of Thiès on April 21, 2009. He received 64 out of 69 votes from the municipal councillors.

References

1959 births
Living people
Prime Ministers of Senegal
Princeton University alumni
Senegalese Democratic Party politicians
People from Thiès
Mayors of places in Senegal
Heads of government who were later imprisoned